Kawasi Lakhma is currently serving as cabinet Minister of Chhattisgarh he was also elected as MLA 5 times consecutively from Konta. He was one of the survivors of 2013 Naxal attack in Darbha valley. His name was widely discussed as his own party men expressed doubt about his integrity and questioned his role in the Naxal attack, when other Congress leaders were shot dead in the attack, Kawasi Lakhma was spared and this has raised doubts.

Early life
Kawasi Lakhma is from Nagaras village, Sonakukanur post, Konta Tehsil, Sukma district, Chhattisgarh and his place is a part of Bastar region.

Political life
Kawasi Lakhma, a tribal leader, was elected as MLA (elected in 2008) from Konta constituency of Chhattisgarh state and he was earlier elected in 2003 with a huge margin (securing 51.54% of votes polled). His constituency is a Naxal hit area and he is capable of interacting with Naxals in their native language.  During 2013 Naxal attack in Darbha Valley, more than 30 people were killed and two other leaders travelling in the same car were taken away and killed by Naxals, sparing Lakhma unharmed and this has raised doubts about the role of Lakhma in the Massacre. As an opposition party MLA, he has raised concerns about the quality of developmental activities undertaken in the Naxal hit Sukma district. He is cabinet minister of Commercial Tax (Excise), Commerce and Industry in government of Chhattisgarh.

Aftar Naxal attack

Bharatiya Janata Party has demanded a narco test on Kawasi Lakhma, so that the details of dialogue he exchanged with Naxals during the deadly attack and any possible conspiracy, can be found out. He won the election and became the minister of the state.

References

Living people

Indian National Congress politicians
Chhattisgarh MLAs 2008–2013
Chhattisgarh MLAs 2003–2008
People from Dantewada district
Year of birth missing (living people)
Chhattisgarh MLAs 2018–2023
Madhya Pradesh MLAs 1998–2003